The Magna Institute of Dental Technology is a dental school located in New York City.

See also

American Student Dental Association
List of dental schools in the United States

References

External links

Dental schools in New York (state)
Private universities and colleges in New York City
Ozone Park, Queens